Shimao Global Financial Center
() is a skyscraper in Changsha, Hunan, China. Construction started in 2014 and was completed in 2019.

Gallery

See also
List of tallest buildings in China

References

Buildings and structures in Changsha
Buildings and structures under construction in China
Skyscrapers in Hunan
Skyscraper office buildings in China